Mátyás Tímár (10 July 1923 – c. 16 February 2020) was a Hungarian politician and economist, who served as Minister of Finance between 1962 and 1967. He also held the office of Governor of the Hungarian National Bank from 10 July 1975 to 15 June 1988.

References
 Rulers.org

1923 births
2020 deaths
Hungarian economists
Members of the Hungarian Socialist Workers' Party
Finance ministers of Hungary
Governors of the Hungarian National Bank